Bahrain Cricket Association is the official governing body of the sport of cricket in Bahrain. Bahrain Cricket Association is Bahrain's representative at the International Cricket Council and is an associate member and has been a member of that body since 2001. It is also a member of the Asian Cricket Council.

History

References

External links
Official Website
Cricinfo-Bahrain

Cricket
Cricket administration
Cricket in Bahrain